Microbacterium sediminicola is a Gram-positive bacterium from the genus Microbacterium which has been isolated from sediments from the Samambula River on Fiji.

References

External links
Type strain of Microbacterium sediminicola at BacDive -  the Bacterial Diversity Metadatabase	

Bacteria described in 2007
sediminicola